Frank Taylor may refer to:

Politics and law
Frank Trafford Taylor (1891–1943), Canadian lawyer
Frank Taylor (British politician) (1907–2003), English MP for Manchester Moss Side
Frank Taylor (Irish politician) (1914–1998), Irish Fine Gael Party politician and TD
Frank J. Taylor, American politician from New York

Sports

Association football (soccer)
Frank Taylor (footballer, born 1887) (1887–1928), English footballer who played for Lincoln City
Frank Taylor (footballer, born 1901) (1901–1973), English footballer who played for Bournemouth and Gillingham
Frank Taylor (Scottish footballer) (born 1909), Scottish footballer
Frank Taylor (footballer, born 1916) (1916–1970), English footballer who played for Wolverhampton Wanderers

Cricket
Frank Taylor (English cricketer) (1855–1936), English cricketer
Frank Taylor (Wellington cricketer) (1859–1937), New Zealand cricketer
Frank Taylor (Auckland cricketer) (1890–1960), New Zealand cricketer

Other sports
Frank M. Taylor (1869–1941), American horse trainer, trained the winner of the Kentucky Derby in 1912
Frank Taylor (American football) (fl. 1890s), American college football coach
Bud Taylor (golfer) (Frank Monroe Taylor Jr., 1916–1991), American amateur golfer
Frank Taylor (journalist) (1920–2002), English sports journalist

Others
Frank Bursley Taylor (1860–1938), American geologist
Frank E. Taylor, American book publisher and film producer
Frank Harold Taylor (1896–1985), World War I flying ace
F. Sherwood Taylor (1897–1956), English historian of science and curator

See also
Francis Taylor (disambiguation)